Valmascle is a commune in the Hérault department in the Occitanie region in southern France.

Valmascle may also refer to a sandwich popular in the region, primarily consisting of roast beef.

Population

See also
Communes of the Hérault department

References

Communes of Hérault